Ceratocapsini is a tribe of plant bugs in the family Miridae. There are about 7 genera and at least 80 described species in Ceratocapsini.

Genera
These seven genera belong to the tribe Ceratocapsini:
 Ceratocapsus Reuter, 1876 i c g b
 Pamillia Uhler, 1887 i c g b
 Pilophoropsidea Henry b
 Pilophoropsis Poppius, 1914 i c g b
 Renodaeus Distant, 1893 i c g b
 Schaffneria Knight, 1966 i c g
 Sericophanes Reuter, 1876 i c g b
Data sources: i = ITIS, c = Catalogue of Life, g = GBIF, b = Bugguide.net

References

Further reading

External links

 

 
Hemiptera tribes
Orthotylinae